SoundStorm was an independent audio post-production and sound editorial company based in Burbank, California. It provided post-production sound design, sound editing and ADR in Hollywood. The editors recorded their sound effect library from 1984 to 2004, worked on more than eighty feature films, and earned a number of awards and nominations from the Academy Awards, Emmy Awards, British Academy Film Awards and Golden Reel Awards. In 2004, the company was dissolved and sold its assets; Soundogs.com Inc. acquired the trademark and complete archive of the SoundStorm sound effects library.

History 
SoundStorm was founded in 1984 by Gordon Ecker as Walla Works Productions, a sound editorial house and post-production facility in Los Angeles for feature films and television projects. It was owned and operated by practicing sound professionals. In the 1990s the company moved to Burbank from Hollywood after several corporate transitions and name changes. Ecker who was the CEO, retired in 1998 and sold the company to six of the firm's original employees; Bruce Stambler, John Leveque, Gary Blufer, John Fanaris, Becky Sullivan, and Richard Yawn. Four of the six owners were sound editors.  The company developed relationships with off-site editorial and mixing facilities to handle re-recording duties on SoundStorm projects. In 2002, it employed about sixty sound professionals, including ten supervising sound editors. The company also recruited Alan Robert Murray who supervised the sound on twenty-eight Clint Eastwood films.

The SoundStorm team worked on more than eighty feature films and television projects. It has contributed to the success of notable films as Under Siege (1992), The Fugitive (1993), Clear and Present Danger (1994), Batman Forever (1995), The Ghost and the Darkness (1996), L.A. Confidential (1997) and The Fast and the Furious (2001)

Besides the action-adventure work, SoundStorm provided sound editorial for independent dramas like Frailty (2001), comedies like Blast from the Past (1999), and prestigious pictures like Pleasantville (1998)

The leading supervising sound editors John Leveque and Bruce Stambler paired together on several projects and achieved a number of awards for sound designing and editing. Stambler was nominated for five in a row for the Academy Award and won with Ghost and the Darkness (1995) for Best Sound Effects Editing. He also won a BAFTA for The Fugitive (1993), an Emmy Award for Miami Vice (1984) and a Golden Reel Award shared with Leveque for Under Siege (1992). John Leveque received Oscar nominations four years in a row and won two BAFTAs for L.A. Confidential (1997) and  The Fugitive (1993) He was also nominated for five Golden Reel Awards.

In 2003, SoundStorm digitized its sound effects library, opened a new sound transfer room featuring Pro Tools HD systems and digital workstations replacing 35mm platforms with a view to coping with the rival firms. In 2004, SoundStorm opened Cloud 9, a sound mixer feature equipped with two dbx Quantum II compressors, two dbx 160SL dual/mono stereo compressor/limiters and a dbx 786 mic pre unit.

Acquisition  

SoundStorm was one of the most recognized independent sound editorial companies in Hollywood when it filed for bankruptcy and sold its assets in 2004. Bruce Stambler, one of its co-founders, left SoundStorm for Soundelux in August 2004 with eight members of his creative team and three studio projects.  Stambler was CEO of SoundStorm and lead supervising sound editor at the firm before relocating to Soundelux.

In 2004, John Leveque also left SoundStorm for Soundelux and started working for Soundelux' London office.  Soundelux has also brought on Sound Supervisor/ADR supervisor Becky Sullivan.

In 2004 Rob Nokes of Sounddogs.com Inc. acquired the trademark and complete archive of the SoundStorm sound effects library when the company decided to dissolve its  sell its assets and partnerships with other sound facilities.

Aftermath  
In 2008, Stambler and Leveque left Soundelux and opened a sound editorial and mixing facility called Studio 8 Sound in Los Angeles with offices also in New York.

Staff 
 Former staffs

 Gordon Ecker, Co-founder, Supervising sound editor (1984–1998)
 John Fanaris, President.
 John Switzer, Vice President
 Charles Meister, former CEO 
 Bruce Stambler, Co-CEO, Supervising sound editor
 John Leveque, Supervising sound editor
 Becky Sullivan, Co-CEO owner  Supervising Sound Editor
 Richard E. Yawn, Sound editor
 Gary Blufer, Sound effects recordist, editor
 Alan Robert Murray, Supervising sound editor
 Tim Walston, Sound designer
 Terry Rodman, Supervising sound editor
 Jay Nierenberg, Supervising sound editor
 Michael Olman, Sound mixer
 Michael Payne, Sound effect editor
 Steve Mann, Sound effect editor
 William Dotson, Supervising sound editor
 Cathie Speakman, Supervising sound editor
 Bernard Weiser, Supervising sound editor
 Lee Lemont, Supervising sound editor
 Glenn Hoskinson, Sound effect editor

Filmography 

 Life of the Party (2005) ... Sound Editing Services
 Noel (2004) ... Sound Editing
 Collateral (2004) ... Sound Effects Editing 
 Cape of Good Hope (2004) ... Mixed At
 The Girl Next Door (2004) ... Sound Post-production
 Club Dread (2004) ... Sound Editing And Re-recording
 Miracle (2004) ... Sound Editing
 Torque (2004) ... Sound Post-production
 Eloise at Christmastime (2003) (TV series) ... Post Production Sound
 American Valor (2003) (TV series) ... Sound Editing
 Elf (2003) ... Sound Editing
 Miss Match (2003) ... Sound Editorial
 Hollywood Homicide (2003) ... Sound Editing
 Carolina (2003) ... Sound Editing, Sound Editorial And Re-recording
 Top Speed (2003) ... Assistant Sound Effects Editing
 Bulletproof Monk (2003) ... Sound Post-production
 Holes (2003) ... Sound Post-production
 The Core (2003) ... Sound Editing
 Dark Blue (2002) ... Sound Editing
 Star Trek: Nemesis (2002) ... Sound Editing
 Waking Up in Reno (2002) ... Sound Design
 Trapped (2002) ... Sound Design & Editorial
 Ritual (2002) ... Sound Editing
 The Banger Sisters (2002) ... Sound Design & Editorial
 xXx (2002) ... Sound Editorial Services 
 Blood Work (2002) ... Sound Editing
 No Good Deed (2002) ... Sound Editing
 Juwanna Mann (2002) ... Sound Editing
 The Sum of All Fears (2002) ... Digital Sound Editing 
 Papal Cab (2002) ... Audio Services
 One Hour Photo (2002) ... Digital Sound Design And Editing
 Queen of the Damned (2002) ... Sound Editing
 Frailty (2001) ... Sound Design And Editorial
 To End All Wars (2001) ... Sound Editorial
 The Fast and the Furious (2001) ... Sound Editing 
 Lara Croft: Tomb Raider (2001) ... Sound Editing
 What's the Worst That Could Happen? (2001) ... Sound Editing Services
 The Caveman's Valentine (2001) ... Sound Editing
 24  (2001–2010) ... Sound Editing 
 Dude, Where's My Car? (2000) ... Sound Editing
 Bad Dog (2000) ... Sound Editing
 Dancing at the Blue Iguana (2000) ... Sound Design And Editorial
 The Replacements (2000) ... Sound Editing
 The Adventures of Rocky and Bullwinkle (2000) ... Sound Editing 
 Scary Movie (2000) ... Sound Editorial Services
 Nurse Betty (2000) ... Sound Editing
 Where the Money Is (2000) ... Editing Facilities
 Son of the Beach (2000) ... Sound Post-production
 The Next Best Thing (2000) ... Sound Editing
 The Magic of Marciano (2000) ... Sound Editing
 South of Heaven, West of Hell (2000) ... Sound Design And Editorial
 Flawless (1999) ... Sound Editing
 Durango Kids (1999) ... Sound Re-recording
 Three Kings (1999) ... Sound Editing
 Simpatico (1999) ... Sound Editing By
 Dudley Do-Right (1999) ... Sound Editing
 Twin Falls Idaho (1999) ... Post Sound Editorial Facilities
 The 13th Warrior (1999) ... Sound Editing
 200 Cigarettes (1999) ... Sound Editing
 8MM (1999) ... Sound Editing 
 Blast from the Past (1999) ... Sound Editing
 Water and Power (1999) ... Sound Editorial
 Pleasantville (1998) ... Sound Editing
 Quest for Camelot (1998) ... Sound Editing
 U.S. Marshals (1998) ... Sound Editing
 In Quiet Night (1998) ... Sound
 Tina Gets Her Man (1998) ... Special Thanks
 The Postman (1997) ... Sound Editing
 Speed 2: Cruise Control (1997) ... Sound Editing
 Batman & Robin (1997) ... Sound Editing 
 L.A. Confidential (1997) ... Sound Editing (as Soundstorm)
 Absolute Power (1997) ... Sound Editing
 Gridlock'd (1997) ... Sound Editing
 The Ghost and the Darkness (1996) ... Sound Editing
 A Time to Kill (1996) ... Sound Editing
 Carpool (1996) ... Sound Editing
 Four Rooms (1995) ... Post-production Sound
 Dangerous Minds (1995) ... Sound Editing
 Batman Forever (1995) ... Sound Editing 
 Clear and Present Danger (1994) ... Sound Effects Editing
 Dream Lover (1993) ... Sound Editing
 The Program (1993) ... Sound Editing
 Body Bags (1993) (TV series) ... Sound Editing
 The Fugitive (1993) ... Sound Editing
 Posse (1993) ... Sound Editing
 Under Siege (1992) ... Sound Editing
 Miami Vice (1984) ... Sound Editing

Awards and recognitions

References

External links
 

Film sound production
Sound archives in the United States
Companies based in Los Angeles County, California
Companies based in Burbank, California
Companies established in 1984
Companies disestablished in 2004
Recording studios in California